Ademar da Silva Braga may refer to:
Ademar Braga (football manager) (born 1945), Brazilian football manager
Ademar Braga (footballer) (born 1976), Brazilian footballer